The Free routine combination competition at the 2017 World Championships was held on 20 and 22 July 2017.

Results
The preliminary round was started on 20 July at 19:00. The final was held on 22 July at 11:00.

Green denotes finalists

References

Free routine combination